Olimpiyskiy Stadium is the biggest entertainment venue in Russia and one of the biggest in Europe. It hosts most shows of international artists during their concert tours.

Events

References

Olimpiyskiy Stadium
Events in Moscow